Charles D. "Pug" Ravenel (February 14, 1938 – March 25, 2017) was an American politician and member of the Democratic Party from South Carolina who won the 1974 Democratic gubernatorial primary. Ravenel was the favorite to win the general election until the South Carolina Supreme Court ruled his candidacy invalid on the grounds that he did not meet the state's residency requirements. The eventual winner of the election was James B. Edwards, the state's first Republican governor in decades.

Early life  
Ravenel was born in Charleston, South Carolina. As a child he attended Cathedral Elementary School and Bishop England High School. Ravenel was given the nickname "Pug" after he ran into a telephone pole at Moultrie Playground. He worked as a newspaper courier for The News and Courier which helped him attend the Phillips Exeter Academy. At Phillips Exeter and Harvard University, Ravenel played football as a quarterback. In 1961, he graduated from Harvard. Ravenel earned a Master's of Business Administration (MBA) from Harvard Business School in 1964. He worked for on Wall Street for the firm Donaldson, Lufkin & Jenrette, and served as a White House Fellow under President Lyndon B. Johnson. In 1967, he co-founded the New York Academy for Black and Latin Education (ABLE) with his friend Michael Bloomberg.

Political career 
In 1972, Ravenel moved back to South Carolina after working on Wall Street.

1974 gubernatorial election

Ravenel's 1974 election platform to become governor of South Carolina, the “Program for Excellence in South Carolina," promised hope and change. His campaign was characterized as positive. He won a crowded Democratic gubernatorial primary and looked like a formidable general election candidate. But the South Carolina Supreme Court ruled that Ravenel failed to meet the five-year residency requirement in the Constitution of South Carolina. During the trial, Ravenel's decision to accept resident memberships instead of nonresident memberships at two separate clubs in Connecticut within the preceding five years was used against him. Ravenel was replaced as the Democratic nominee by the runner-up in the primary, Congressman William Jennings Bryan Dorn.

1978 U.S. Senate election

Ravenel was the Democratic nominee in the 1978 United States Senate election in South Carolina, but failed to unseat incumbent Senator Strom Thurmond.

1980 U.S. House election

In 1980, Ravenel was the Democratic nominee to represent South Carolina's 1st congressional district in the United States House of Representatives, but lost to Republican Thomas F. Hartnett. Ravenel's cousin Arthur Ravenel Jr. later became the district's representative.

Later life 
After the end of his political career, Ravenel became associated with Charleston Trees, an organization that plants trees in Charleston. His focus was the beautification of East Bay Street on the Charleston peninsula.

In 1995, Ravenel pleaded guilty to bank fraud conspiracy for his involvement with the failure of Citadel Federal Savings Bank. He served his full sentence of 11 months and 17 days. Ravenel was pardoned by President Bill Clinton on January 20, 2001, Clinton's last day in office.

References

External links 

 Charles D. Ravenel Papers at South Carolina Political Collections, University of South Carolina

1938 births
2017 deaths
20th-century American businesspeople
20th-century American politicians
American white-collar criminals
American bankers
Businesspeople from Charleston, South Carolina
Harvard Business School alumni
Harvard University alumni
Phillips Exeter Academy alumni
Recipients of American presidential pardons
South Carolina Democrats